Increased Damnation is a compilation album by the Norwegian black metal band Aura Noir. It includes their first mini-album Dreams Like Deserts (tracks 9 to 14). Released Damnation and Broth of Oblivion also appear on Deep Tracts of Hell but are different recordings than on the album. The tracks 5 to 8 are songs from Black Thrash Attack played live. Tower of Limbs and Fever is the first song by Aura Noir ever recorded.

Track listing
"Mirage" – 2:40
"Towers of Limbs and Fevers" – 3:17
"Released Damnation" – 4:04
"Broth of Oblivion" – 4:39
"Swarm of Vultures" – 2:26
"The One Who Smite" – 4:16
"Wretched Face of Evil" – 4:10
"Fighting for Hell" – 3:50
"The Rape" – 3:24
"Forlorn Blessing to the Dream King" – 3:26
"Dreams Like Deserts" – 4:57
"Angel Ripper" – 3:47
"Snake" – 1:45
"Mirage" – 2:57
"Tower of Limbs and Fevers" – 2:01 (Original Version)

Credits
Aggressor - Bass, Guitar, Drums, Vocals, Instrumentation
Apollyon - Bass, Drums, Vocals, Instrumentation
Blasphemer - Guitar
Fenriz - Guest vocals on tracks 1 and 2

Aura Noir albums
2000 compilation albums